2,4-Dinitrophenylhydrazine (2,4-DNPH or DNPH) is the organic compound C6H3(NO2)2NHNH2. DNPH is a red to orange solid. It is a substituted hydrazine. The solid is relatively sensitive to shock and friction. For this reason DNPH is usually handled as a wet powder. DNPH is a precursor to the drug Sivifene.

Synthesis
It can be prepared by the reaction of hydrazine sulfate with 2,4-dinitrochlorobenzene:

DNP test
DNPH is a reagent in instructional laboratories on qualitative organic analysis. Brady's reagent or Borche's reagent, is prepared by dissolving DNPH in a solution containing methanol and some concentrated sulfuric acid. This  solution is used to detect ketones and aldehydes. A positive test is signalled by the formation of a yellow, orange or red precipitate of the dinitrophenylhydrazone. Aromatic carbonyls give red precipitates whereas aliphatic carbonyls give more yellow color. The reaction between DNPH and a generic ketone to form a hydrazone is shown below:

RR'C=O   +   C6H3(NO2)2NHNH2   →   C6H3(NO2)2NHN=CRR'   +   H2O

This reaction is, overall, a condensation reaction as two molecules joining together with loss of water. Mechanistically, it is an example of addition-elimination reaction: nucleophilic addition of the -NH2 group to the C=O carbonyl group, followed by the elimination of a H2O molecule:

DNP-derived hydrazones have characteristic melting points, facilitating identification of the carbonyl. In particular, the use of DNPH was developed by Brady and Elsmie. Modern spectroscopic and spectrometric techniques have superseded these techniques.

DNPH does not react with other carbonyl-containing functional groups such as carboxylic acids, amides, and esters, for which there is resonance-associated stability as a lone-pair of electrons interacts with the p orbital of the carbonyl carbon resulting in increased delocalization in the molecule. This stability would be lost by addition of a reagent to the carbonyl group. Hence, these compounds are more resistant to addition reactions. Also, with carboxylic acids, there is the effect of the compound acting as a base, leaving the resulting carboxylate negatively charged and hence no longer vulnerable to nucleophilic attack.

Safety
Dry DNPH is friction and shock sensitive. For this reason, it’s supplied damp or ‘wetted’ when a school purchases it from a chemical supplier. If DNPH is stored improperly and left to dry out, it can become explosive.
It is artificial uncoupler of electron transport chain (ETC).

See also
 Tollens' reagent
 Fehling's reagent
 Schiff test

References

Nitrobenzenes
Reagents for organic chemistry
Hydrazines